Dataplot is a public domain software system for scientific visualization and statistical analysis. It was developed and is being maintained at the National Institute of Standards and Technology. Dataplot's source code is available and in public domain.

External links
NIST website
NIST SED website

References 

Free plotting software
Public-domain software with source code